USS Summit (AMc-106) was an Accentor-class coastal minesweeper acquired by the U.S. Navy for the dangerous task of removing mines from minefields laid in the water to prevent ships from passing.

Summit was laid down on 24 March 1941 by the Snow Shipyards Co., Rockland, Maine; launched on 20 September 1941; sponsored by Miss Louise Dey; and commissioned on 29 January 1942.

World War II service 

They arrived on 25 February and, upon completion of training, were routed onward to Key West, Florida, for duty in the 7th Naval District. Summit arrived there on 16 March 1942 and served that district until June 1945.

Assigned as IX-232 

Summit was reassigned to the Naval Auxiliary Air Station, Mayport, Florida, on 30 June. Her minesweeping equipment was removed, and she was detailed to duty in connection with aviation duty as a target towing ship. Her designation was changed from AMc-106 to IX-232 on 10 August. In November, she was ordered to the Naval Air Station, Pensacola, Florida, and reported there, on 13 December 1945, for duty with the Naval Air Training Command.

Post-war decommissioning 

Summit was found to be in excess of Naval requirements in May 1946 and was decommissioned on 28 May. She was struck from the Navy list on 29 October 1946.

References

External links 
 Dictionary of American Naval Fighting Ships
 NavSource Online: Mine Warfare Vessel Photo Archive - Summit (IX-232) - ex-AMc-106

 

Accentor-class minesweepers
Tugs of the United States Navy
Ships built in Rockland, Maine
1941 ships